Most of the schools and colleges in Pathanamthitta district are in Pandalam Kozhencherry, Thiruvalla, Ranni, Adoor and Pathanamthitta.

NSS College, Pandalam established in 1950 is the oldest 
institution of higher learning in the district.

Catholicate College Pathanamthitta was established in 1951 by Malankara Orthodox Syrian Church. The college contributed much to the social and cultural fabric of Pathanamthitta.  The college was an upgradation of Catholicate High School which was founded before that.

Schools 
NSS Higher Secondary School, Pandalam
Government Higher Secondary School, Thottakkoonam, Pandalam
St. Thomas English Medium High School, Kurampala, Pandalam
Eminence Public School, Pandalam
NSS Higher Secondary School, Thattayil, Pandalam
Amrita Vidyalayam,Pandalam
Seventh Day Adventist Higher Secondary School, Azhoor, Pathanamthitta, (ICSE,ISC)
NSK International School, Thumpamon, Pandalam, (IGCSE - Cambridge Curriculum)
P.S.V.P.M.H.S.S, Iravon
M.K.Letha Memorial Public School, Iravon (ICSE Institute)
Mount Bethany Public School, Kumbazha
Nss Hss Kunnamthanam, Mallappally
G.V.H.S.S & H.S.S Kalanjoor
CMS Higher Secondary School Mallappally
Sacred Heart High School
Holy Angels School Adoor
Government High School Adoor
Kendriya Vidyalaya Adoor
St Mary's High School Adoor
Thapovan School Adoor
M.G.M Higher Secondary School, Thiruvalla
Catholicate Higher Secondary School
Kiddies crown preschool & day care (play school)
St Mary's Central School, Pathanamthitta
Jawahar Navodaya Vidyalaya, Vechoochira, Pathanamthitta
Kendriya Vidyalaya, Pathanamthitta
Holy Angels Model School, Pathanamthitta
 Amritha Vidialayam Kallarakadavu Pathanamthitta
Holy Angles Model SchoolMundukottakal Po Pathanamthitta Kerala
SDA School, Pathanamthitta
Abraham Marthoma Memorial Higher Secondary School, Pathanamthitta
Arya Bharathi High School, Omalloor, Pathanamthitta
Madonna International Residenal School , Pathanamthitta
S.N.D.P Higher Secondary School, Chenneerkkara, Pathanamthitta
Athurasramam central school, kodunthara, Pathanamthitta
M.T.L.P. School Vengal, Thiruvalla, Pathanamthitta
Syrian Christian Higher Secondary School, Ranny
M.S. Higher Secondary School, Ranny
ST. Mary's Higher Secondary School, Ranny
Citadel Higher Secondary School, Ranny
St. Mary's Residential Public School, Thiruvalla
 Abraham Marthoma Memorial Higher Secondary School
 Jawahar Navodaya Vidyalaya, Mannadisala, Vechoochira

Arts & Science colleges 
Bishop Abraham Memorial College, Thurithicadu
Catholicate College, Pathanamthitta
College of Applied Science, Pathanamthitta
College of Applied Sciences (I.H.R.D.), Adoor
College of Applied Sciences (I.H.R.D.), Kalanjoor
Devaswom Board College, Parumala
Govt Arts & science College, Elanthoor, Pathanamthitta
 Mannam Memorial N S S College, Konni
 Mar Athanasios College for Advanced Studies (MACFAST), Tiruvalla
 Mar Thoma Academy (near TMM Hospital), Tiruvalla
 Mar Thoma College, Kuttapuzha, Tiruvalla
 Musaliar College of Arts and Science,Pathanamthitta
MMNSS College Konni
 N. S. S. College, Pandalam
 Pamba DB College, Parumala, Tiruvalla
 Parumala mar Gregorious College Valanjavalttom, Tiruvalla 
 Prince Marthandavarma College, Peringara, Tiruvalla
SAS SNDP Yogam College, Konni
 SN College, Othera
St. Cyril's College, Adoor
St. Thomas College, Kozhencherry
St. Thomas College, Thuruthicaud
St. Thomas College, Ranni
St Thomas College,Thavalappara,Konni
Viswa Brahmana College, Vechoochira
VNS College Of Arts and Science, konni
 IATS (International Air Travel Studies) Adoor

Engineering Colleges 

Caarmel Engineering College, Perunad
College of Engineering, Aranmula
College of Engineering, Kallooppara
College of Engineering, Adoor
K.V.V.S. Institute of Technology, Kaithapparamb,Adoor.
Mount Zion College of Engineering
Musaliar College of Engineering and Technology, Kumbazha 
Sree Buddha College of Engineering, Elavumthitta
Sree Narayana Institute of Technology [SNIT], Adoor, Pathanamthitta

Computer Application Colleges

 Musaliar College of Arts and Science, Pathanamthitta

Industrial Training 

Govt. Polytechnic (Nodal Polytechnic), Vennikulam
Govt. Polytechnic, Adoor
Govt. Polytechnic, Vechoochira
Govt.poly Technic,Vennikulam
N.S.S. Polytechnic (Private), Pandalam
Mar Philexenos ITI, Mylapra

Law 
 Law College, Central University of Kerala, Thiruvalla

Management 

K.V.V.S. Institute of Technology, Adoor
Mar Athanasios College for Advanced Studies, Tiruvalla
Mar Athanasius College of Advanced Studies, Pathanamthitta
 Mulamoottil International Business School (MIBS), Tiruvalla
 Musaliar College of Arts and Science, Pathanamthitta
 SS Academy of Management and Science (SSMS), Thiruvalla
St. John's College Thorrupram, Pathanamthitta

Medical Colleges 

Believers Church Medical College, Kuttappuzha, Thiruvalla
Pushpagiri Institute of Medical Sciences and Research Centre, Thiruvalla
Mount Zion Medical College Enadimangalam, Adoor
 Mannam Ayurveda Co-operative Medical College, Pandalam

Commerce College
 Musaliar College of Arts and Science,Pathanamthitta

Nursing 

College of Nursing, Pathanamthitta
Archana College of Nursing, Pandalam
NSS Nursing College, Pandalam
M.G.M. Muthoot College of Nursing, Kallarakadavu, Pathanamthitta
Pushpagiri College of Nursing, Pathanamthitta
 T.M.M. College of Nursing, Tiruvalla

Pharmacy 

 Nazareth College of Pharmacy, Othera, Tiruvalla
 Pushpagiri college of pharmacy

Teacher Education 
H.H. Marthoma Mathews II Training College, Pathanamthitta
Kerala University College of Teacher Education, Pathanamthitta
Mahatma Gandhi University College of Teacher Education, Pathanamthitta
Mar Severios Memorial Training College, Thiruvalla
Marthoma Nursery Teacher Training Institute, Tiruvalla
Marthoma Training College, Edakulam
NSS Training College, Pandalam
S.V.G.V. Training College, Aranmula
Sankaramangalam Training College, Thiruvalla
St. Mary Women's College of Teacher Education, Thiruvalla
Titus II Teachers College, Thiruvalla

Universities 
 MG university off campus, Kaviyoor, Thiruvalla

An engineering college, which is government-controlled and self-financing, managed by Cochin University, is at Kallooppara: the College of Engineering Kallooppara.

There are two private-sector medical colleges in Tiruvalla: the Pushpagiri medical college and the Believers Church medical college. These are the only medical colleges in the district. There is also a dental college, the Pushpagiri Dental College, in Tiruvalla.

References
 Musaliar College of Arts and Science, Pathanamthitta